Lovers Rock is the fifth studio album by English band Sade, released on 13 November 2000 by Epic Records. The album was titled after a style of reggae music known as lovers rock, noted for its romantic sound and content, which frontwoman Sade Adu listened to in her youth. Lovers Rock was seen as a departure from the band's previous use of jazz elements, opting instead for a wider use of musical elements from soul music, R&B, soft rock, folk music, dub, reggae, neo soul and lovers rock. The album's production has been characterised as spare, with simple arrangements and reggae flourishes. A concept album, the lyrics focus on both the positive and the negative sides of love; the album's lyrical content also touches upon political themes.

Upon release, Lovers Rock was met with generally positive reviews from music critics, who praised the band's musical direction. The album earned Sade the Grammy Award for Best Pop Vocal Album in 2002. Commercially, the album reached number 18 on the UK Albums Chart and number three on the US Billboard 200. It has since been certified triple platinum by the Recording Industry Association of America (RIAA), having sold over 3 million copies in the United States by February 2010. The album spawned two singles—"By Your Side" and "King of Sorrow"—and was further promoted by the band's Lovers Rock Tour. Following the release of Love Deluxe (1992), the band began an eight-year hiatus, during which Adu would experience media scrutiny and give birth to her first child.

Background
The band's fourth studio album, Love Deluxe, was released on 26 October 1992. The album peaked at number three on the US Billboard 200 and has sold 3.4 million copies in the United States. It was later certified four-times platinum by the Recording Industry Association of America (RIAA) for shipments of four million copies. The album was also commercially successful elsewhere, reaching number one in France and the top 10 in the Netherlands, New Zealand, Sweden, Switzerland and the United Kingdom. Following the release of Love Deluxe, the band took an eight-year hiatus, during which Adu came under media scrutiny with rumours of depression and addiction, and later went on to give birth to her first child. During this time, the other members of the band—Stuart Matthewman, Paul S. Denman, and Andrew Hale—worked on side projects, including the band Sweetback, which released a self-titled album in 1996. Matthewman also played a major role in the development of Maxwell's career, providing instrumentation and production work for the R&B singer's first two albums.

Recording

Lovers Rock was recorded in only a year, and was influenced by Adu's experiences during the eight-year hiatus. The album's recording took place between September 1999 and August 2000 at three locations—Sarm Hook End and Deliverance Studios, both in London, and El Cortijo Studios in San Pedro de Alcántara, Spain. The band produced and arranged the album; Hale served as the album's keyboards and programmer, Matthewman served as the album's guitarist, programmer, woodwind player whilst Denman provided the album's bass. Mike Pela helped with the co-production of the album and its recording, Andy "Nipper" Davies served as the assistant engineer and Tom Coyne mastered Lovers Rock.

Additional help came from a variety of people. Karl Van Den Bossche supplied the album's percussion, while Nick Ingman supplied the string arrangements on the song "King of Sorrow". Andy Nice provided the cello on "Every Word" and Janusz Podrazik provided keyboards on two of the album's songs "Immigrant" and "It's Only Love That Gets You Through", additional vocals for the album came from vocalist Leroy Osbourne. The album's recording and themes were inspired by Adu's experiences during the previous decade, particularly of how she had become preoccupied with the complexity of other people's lives and extremely unhappy.

Content

Unlike Sade's previous work, Lovers Rock did not contain saxophones or instrumentation, but instead spare, deceptively simple arrangement—sometimes no more than an acoustic guitar. The album's music borrowed reverb and echo effects from dub as well as an ease and fluidity, tougher beats and basslines, from R&B. Ed Hogan of AllMusic stated that Lovers Rock was the first album by the band that contained a more experimental sound with the infusion of mainstream rock elements and strummed guitars. According to Rob Sheffield of Rolling Stone, the groove on Lovers Rock is predominantly "light", with "slight reggae flourishes" appearing throughout. He noted that the songs, each lasting around five minutes, rarely vary from one another in rhythm. Del F. Cowie of Exclaim! described Lovers Rock as a collection of songs with sparse arrangements, based upon acoustic guitars with gently applied beats.

Lovers Rock was seen as offering a more stripped-down, subtle backdrop than the band's previous work, and the album's production saw the use of modern dance beats and reggae. Lovers Rock was described as a concept album by Sal Cinquemani of Slant Magazine, who stated the album was lyrically a "soundtrack for lovers, lovers who are in love and making love and lovers who have been scorned." Cinquemani also noted political themes of two of the album's songs, "Slave Song" and "Immigrant", which were noted as social statements. Lovers Rock contains a continuous composition, with each song leading to the next with a "united flow." The album's lyrics were described as being fixated on the themes of love, loss and rejection.

The album opens with the lead single "By Your Side", a hymnlike song that received comparisons to "A Whiter Shade of Pale" and "No Woman, No Cry". Lyrically, Adu insists she will never leave someone in trouble.
"Flow" is sonically a mixture of folky acoustic guitar, slow-paced hip hop loops, and layered harmonies. "King of Sorrow" explores the complexities of a faltering relationship, in which Adu is torn between what she has invested and the opportunities she might be missing. "The Sweetest Gift" is an acoustic song, which is dedicated to the Rainbow Trust Children's Charity caring for children who have a life-threatening or terminal illness and their families, both in their own homes and at the Trust's two UK family respite centres.
"Slave Song" is lyrically a social statement, calling for an awareness of history and the sensibility to rise above it, the song's concept is introduced through lyrics like; "Teach my beloved children who have been enslaved/To reach for the light continually." "Immigrant" is backed by hip hop beats, and explores racial tensions with lyrics including, "Coming from where he did/He was turned away from every door like Joseph/To even the strongest among us/That would be too much."

Release and promotion
The album was first released in the United Kingdom on 13 November 2000. Lovers Rock was titled after the romantic strain of reggae also known as lovers rock, which Adu listened to in her youth. "By Your Side" was released as the lead single from the album and was nominated for the 2002 Grammy Award for Best Female Pop Vocal Performance, but lost out to Nelly Furtado's "I'm Like a Bird". It also placed at number 48 on VH1's list of the "100 Greatest Love Songs". The single reached number 75 on the US Billboard Hot 100 and number 17 on the UK Singles Chart. "King of Sorrow" was released as the album's second single on 12 March 2001. The song performed poorly on charts, peaking at number 59 on the UK chart and failing to impact the US Billboard Hot 100, instead reaching number one on the US Billboard Bubbling Under R&B/Hip-Hop Singles chart.

To promote the album, Sade embarked on the Lovers Rock Tour across North America, which was announced via Sade's website in April 2001. The announcement stated the tour would begin in the summer of 2001 with 30 shows. Initial dates were rescheduled due to extended rehearsal time. The shows sold well, with many stops adding additional shows. In August 2001, the tour was extended by eight weeks, due to ticket demand.
Deemed by many critics as a comeback tour, it marked the band's first performance since 1994 and lasted until 2011. Although many believed the trek would expand to other countries, this never came to fruition. It became the 13th highest-grossing tour of 2001, earning $26,488,293 million and drawing 491,151 audience members to 42 concerts.

Following the tour, Sade released their first live album, Lovers Live, on 5 February 2002 by Epic Records. Lovers Live reached number 10 on the US Billboard 200 and number 51 on the UK Albums Chart, Sade's first album to miss the top 20 in the UK. The album was certified gold by the RIAA on 7 March 2002, having sold 562,000 copies in the US, while the DVD was certified platinum on 30 January 2003 for shipments in excess of 100,000 copies.

Critical reception

Upon release, Lovers Rock received generally positive reviews from music critics. At Metacritic, which assigns a normalised rating out of 100 to reviews from mainstream publications, the album received an average score of 78, based on 11 reviews. Ed Hogan of AllMusic praised Sade's choice to infuse "more mainstream rock elements (prominent strummed guitars) into her music." Michael Paoletta of Billboard described the album as "sterling" and "signature Sade". James Hannaham of Spin found Lovers Rock "demo-like in its simplicity" and praised its "airy" tones, dubbing the album "ephemeral". In a review for Rolling Stone, Rob Sheffield wrote that the album "sounds exactly like Sade, heavily influenced by Diamond Life with a bit of Love Deluxe thrown in. Needless to say, it's also pretty damn good, because this smooth operator shrewdly sticks to the tricks she'd already mastered before turning pro."

Yahoo! Music UK critic Cyd Jaymes also gave the album a positive review, stating, "Back with the same band that helped her notch up such smoky, smooth jazz hits as 'Your Love Is King', 'Smooth Operator' and 'The Sweetest Taboo', Sade has produced an album of class, sophistication and melancholy soul." Ken Tucker of Entertainment Weekly praised the album's cohesiveness, saying each "song melts into the next; the result is an undifferentiated dreaminess." In a more mixed review, Q considered Lovers Rock less memorable than Sade's "past triumphs", but highlighted the "refined ache and minimalist chic" of certain songs. Revolution said that the band had not taken "a gigantic creative leap forward", assessing Lovers Rock as an "acceptable soul album for the adoring Sade fan". On 27 February 2002, the album earned Sade the Grammy Award for Best Pop Vocal Album.

Commercial performance
Lovers Rock debuted at number 18 on the UK Albums Chart, selling 28,245 copies in its first week. The album had sold 325,363 copies in the United Kingdom as of February 2010, and was certified platinum by the British Phonographic Industry (BPI) on 22 July 2013. Lovers Rock debuted at number three on the Billboard 200 with 370,000 copies sold in its first week, marking the largest first-week sales of 2000 by a British artist in the United States. It spent 58 weeks on the chart, and went on to become the 14th best-selling album of 2001 in the US and the 109th best-selling album of the 2000s decade. On 18 July 2001, it was certified triple platinum by the RIAA, and had sold 3.9 million copies in the United States by February 2010. The album also peaked at number two on Billboards Top R&B/Hip-Hop Albums chart, as well as number 13 on the Canadian Albums Chart, where it was later certified double platinum by the Canadian Recording Industry Association (CRIA).

Track listing

Personnel
Credits adapted from the liner notes of Lovers Rock.

Sade
 Sade Adu – vocals
 Andrew Hale – keyboards, programming
 Stuart Matthewman – guitars, woodwinds, programming
 Paul S. Denman – bass

Additional musicians
 Leroy Osbourne – vocals
 Karl Van Den Bossche – percussion
 Janusz Podrazik – keyboards on "Immigrant" and "It's Only Love That Gets You Through"
 Andy Nice – cello on "Every Word"
 Nick Ingman – string arrangement on "King of Sorrow"

Technical
 Sade – production, arrangement
 Mike Pela – co-production, recording
 Andy "Nipper" Davies – engineering assistance
 Tom Coyne – mastering

Artwork
 Albert Watson – cover photography, all other photographs
 Sophie Muller – cover photography
 Melissa Caplan – Sade inside photograph
 Intro – design

Charts

Weekly charts

Year-end charts

Decade-end charts

Certifications and sales

See also
 List of number-one albums of 2000 (Poland)

References

Further reading
 
 

2000 albums
Epic Records albums
Grammy Award for Best Pop Vocal Album
Reggae albums by English artists
Sade (band) albums